Terrylene Sacchetti (born February 5, 1967) is a deaf actress from Chicago, Illinois. She graduated from the Model Secondary School for the Deaf in 1985.

Her most well known work in the film industry is for Natural Born Killers (1994), After Image (2001) and Listen Carefully (1991). She is also known in the deaf community for her advocacy for the right to sign language and early intervention for deaf infants.

Personal life
Terrylene is from a fourth generation deaf family.

She was in a relationship with Robert Manganelli, a film maker until around 2008. They had two children, Gianni (Gio) Manganelli and Catalene Robin Manganelli. Gio died in March 2014. In the wake of his death, she has been vocal about the lack of access to mental health care for deaf persons.

Career

Deaf rights 
In 1994, a Los Angeles Burger King drive-up window refused to fill Terrylene's order that she tried to give in writing. She sued Burger King for discrimination and was hired as a consultant to help implement electronic ordering devices for the deaf.

Deaf education 
Terrylene launched "Clerc's Children". An online bilingual (English/ASL) educational website for families with deaf infants and toddlers.

Deaf art 
Terrylene is "co-founder and executive director of the Deaf Arts Council (DAC)".

She held that position for five years. At that time she received a Department of Education grant of $350,000 and an additional donation of $500,000 from film studios in Hollywood to fund this project. She also received a grant to do a deaf film making summer camp.

Filmography
In 1999 she appeared together with her son in an Oreo's commercial. The commercial shows the two of them discussing in ASL the various ways of eating an Oreo cookie.

Film

Television

Awards and recognition 
2013, received a $2,500 grant from Deafhood Foundation for her educational website "Clerc's Children" 
1997, Best Performance, Dramalogue for Sweet Nothing in My Ear
1996, Christopher Reeve Scholarship, The Valdez Award (Drama)
1994, "Woman of the Year" in recognition of her achievements as an equal rights advocate by the city of Los Angeles

References

Further reading

See also 

http://www.clercschildren.com/
ASL Oreo commercial on YouTube with Terrylene and her son

1967 births
Living people
Actresses from Illinois
Actresses from Chicago
American deaf actresses
American deaf people
21st-century American women